South Downs is a 2011 play by the British playwright and author David Hare. It is set in 1962 in a public school, similar to Hare's own school, Lancing, in the South Downs. It is a response to Terence Rattigan's 1948 play The Browning Version and was commissioned by Rattigan's estate to mark Rattigan's Centenary.

It premiered alongside a revival of Rattigan's The Browning Version from 2 September to 8 October 2011 at the Minerva Theatre, Chichester (the small auditorium of the Chichester Festival Theatre). The two plays were directed separately by Jeremy Herrin (South Downs) and Angus Jackson (The Browning Version).

The plays re-opened after a sell-out run at Chichester, at the Harold Pinter Theatre, London, on 24 April 2012 for three-months.

A radio version was produced for BBC Radio 4, broadcast on 1 September 2012. It was also directed by Jeremy Herrin, produced by Catherine Bailey, and performed by the original cast members.

Roles

References

External links

Reviews and awards

2011, Chichester, Minerva Theatre
The Telegraph Review Four Stars
Guardian Review Four Stars
The Times Review Four Stars
Evening Standard Review Four Stars
The Independent Online Review Four Stars

2012, London, The Harold Pinter Theatre
Full list of reviews 
Nominated for Best New Play by The Theatre Awards UK
Nominated for Best Play and Jonathan Bailey for Outstanding Newcomer by the London Evening Standard Theatre Awards 2012
Alex Lawther nominated for London Newcomer of the Year by the What'sOnStage Awards 2012

Plays by David Hare
2011 plays
Plays set in England
Plays based on other plays
Adaptations of works by Terence Rattigan